Kingswood University is an evangelical Christian University associated with the Wesleyan Church, located in Sussex, New Brunswick, Canada. It is accredited by the Commission on Accreditation of the Association for Biblical Higher Education. It is chartered by the province of New Brunswick and authorized to confer degrees in church-related education. The university is also registered with the Evangelical Fellowship of Canada, the Association of Christian Schools International, and the Christian Higher Education Canada (CHEC).

History

Kingswood University was founded in October 1945, in Woodstock, New Brunswick by the Alliance of the Reformed Baptist Church of Canada as the Holiness Bible Institute. Its primary purpose was the training of ministers to serve the Reformed Baptist Church within the Atlantic region. In 1947, the school was relocated to Yarmouth, Nova Scotia and renamed Bethany Bible College.

In 1965, Bethany relocated a second time to its present location in Sussex, New Brunswick. In July 1966, the Alliance of the Reformed Baptist Church of Canada joined the Wesleyan Methodist Church. Two years later in June 1968, the Wesleyan Methodist Church merged with the Pilgrim Holiness Church to form what is known today as The Wesleyan Church.

Over the course of time, the university has made significant advances in its academic programs. In May 1970, the General Board of Administration of The Wesleyan Church authorized Bethany Bible College to award the Bachelor of Arts Degree in Religion, the basic four-year program for those entering full-time ministerial service. In 1983, the Province of New Brunswick, through official legislation, authorized Bethany to grant church-related degrees. Accreditation was granted in 1987 by the Association for Biblical Higher Education and reaffirmed in 1997.

On July 1, 2015, Dr. Stephen J. Lennox became Kingswood's 12th president of the university. 

In the fall of 2011, the name of Bethany Bible College was formally changed to Kingswood University.

Location
Kingswood University is located on the west side of Sussex, New Brunswick. The campus is split between the lower campus located off Main Street and the upper campus located on top of a hill. The back side of campus is ringed by the Kennebecasis River.

Academics

Degrees offered
Master of Arts in Pastoral Theology
Bachelor of Theology
Bachelor of Arts in Christian School Education
Bachelor of Arts in Ministry
Associate of Arts
Associate of Arts Degree in Evangelism & Compassion Ministry

Major and Minor programs of study
Children's Ministry
Christian Counselling
Christian Education
Church Planting
Intercultural Studies
Worship Leading
Pastoral Ministry
Youth Ministry
Business

Athletics
Kingswood athletic teams are known as the Blazers. All teams use the Blazer logo which is a red flame.

Kingswood Blazer collegiate teams
Co-ed Soccer, Co-ed Hockey, Men’s Basketball, Co-ed Volleyball.

Intramural sports 

Basketball, Beach Volleyball, Soccer, Table Tennis

Other leisure and recreational activities
Canoeing and kayaking the Kennebecasis River and Saint John River
Cross-country skiing at Fundy National Park or the walking trails of Sussex
Downhill skiing and snowboarding at the nearby Poley Mountain Ski Resort
Golfing and Curling at the Sussex Golf & Curling Club
Hiking and camping at Fundy Park, Caton's Island or the nearby "bluff"
Horseback riding at Circle Square Ranch
Ice skating at the 8th Hussars arena
Indoor swimming at the Fairway Inn
Sea kayaking in Alma, New Brunswick on the Bay of Fundy
Skateboarding at the 8th Hussars sports arena (Via outdoor fenced in skate park)
Walking trails of Sussex
Hiking at the Fundy Trail Parkway in St. Martins, New Brunswick

See also

Higher education in New Brunswick
List of universities and colleges in New Brunswick

References

External links

Kingswood University

Universities in New Brunswick
Bible colleges
Education in Kings County, New Brunswick
Educational institutions established in 1945
Universities and colleges affiliated with the Wesleyan Church
Evangelical universities and colleges in Canada
1945 establishments in New Brunswick
Private universities and colleges in Canada